The head tube is the part of a cycle's tubular frame within which the front fork steerer tube is mounted.  On a motorcycle, the "head tube" is normally called the steering head.  On bicycles the manufacturer's brand located on the head tube is known as a head badge.

Bearings
The head tube holds the bearings which allow the front fork steerer tube to pivot freely.

 In bicycles, these bearings are collectively called the headset. These are usually ball bearings, although some headsets use needle bearings.

 In motorcycles, these bearings are also referred to as headset, or steering head bearings or steering neck bearings. These are usually tapered roller bearings.

Caster angle
The steering axis angle, also called caster angle, is the angle that the head tube and hence the steering axis makes with the horizontal or vertical, depending on convention. The steering axis is the axis about which the steering mechanism (fork, handlebars, front wheel, etc.) pivots.

 In bicycles, the steering axis angle is called the head angle and is measured clock-wise from the horizontal when viewed from the right side. A 90° head angle would be vertical. For example, Lemond offers:
a 2007 Filmore, designed for the track, with a head angle that varies from 72.5° to 74° depending on frame size
a 2006 Tete de Course, designed for road racing, with a head angle that varies from 71.25° to 74°, depending on frame size.
 In motorcycles, the steering axis angle is called the rake and is measured counter-clock-wise from the vertical when viewed from the right side. A 0° rake would be vertical. For example, Moto Guzzi offers:
a 2007 Breva V 1100 with a rake of 25°30’ (25 degrees and 30 minutes)
a 2007 Nevada Classic 750 with a rake of 27.5° (27.5 degrees)

Head tube diameters
Head tubes can use one of several size standards

  Bicycles
The head tube of a bicycle is sometimes designated by the fork steerer column it accepts. This can lead to confusion, since head tube inside diameters are dependent on the headset standard. For example, frames that take one inch (25.4 mm) steerer columns can have three different inside diameters for threaded and threadless headsets (not including integrated-type headsets). The wide variety of integrated and non-standard, proprietary headsets that some frame manufacturers have created (and abandoned in some cases) makes listing all current and past head tube dimensions problematic. The following table includes the most common sizes; nominal head tube diameters are assuming a 0.1-0.2 mm interference fit, which is what most head tube reaming cutters are designed to bore. Adequate press fits are typically between 0.1 and 0.25 mm of interference.

 Motorcycles
Standard motorcycle head tubes and headsets are sized for a one inch (25.4 mm) diameter fork steerer tube.

References

See also
Bicycle fork
Bicycle frame
Motorcycle fork

Bicycle parts
Motorcycle frames